Zhizun Hongyan may refer to:

Lady Wu: The First Empress, a 2004 Chinese TV series
Women of Times, a 2006 Singaporean TV series